The Argyll Highland jacket is a shorter than regular jacket with gauntlet cuffs and pocket flaps and front cutaway for wearing with a sporran and kilt. It can be of tweed, tartan or solid colour material. The Argyll is the standard day wear jacket.

Other jackets of the same cutaway for the sporran and kilt are known by other names, such as  Crail and Braemar but they are generally often just referred to as an Argyll jacket.

Gallery

References

Jackets
Scottish clothing